Harry Peeters (born 19 July 1920) was a Belgian rower. He competed in the men's coxed four at the 1936 Summer Olympics.

References

External links
  

1920 births
Possibly living people
Belgian male rowers
Olympic rowers of Belgium
Rowers at the 1936 Summer Olympics
Place of birth missing